Claus Illemann Nielsen (born 13 January 1964), known as Claus Nielsen, is a Danish former football player in the forward position. He spent the bulk of his career with Brøndby IF, but also played for the Greek club Panathinaikos and the Dutch club FC Twente.

Club career

Brøndby
Nielsen played for Brøndby from July 1984 until July 1988, at the top level 1.Division in Denmark (later renamed Superliga in 1991). With a total appearance in 167 games during his first four years in the club, he was counted on as one of the most regular first team players at the pitch. In 1984, he helped Brøndby to win the clubs first title, when he scored the winning goal of the Danish League Cup final against AGF. He scored several goals for Brøndby in 1984, but as he only played the last autumn half of the tournament, it was not enough to qualify him as the clubs topscorer of the year (that title went for Jens Kolding with 11 goals). Claus Nielsen however subsequently managed to become the clubs topscorer for the next three years; by scoring 17 goals in 1985, then 16 goals in 1986, and finally 20 goals in 1987.

In 1985 Claus Nielsen was honoured with the title "best Brøndby player of the year", and he also managed to qualify as the overall topscorer of the Danish league in 1986 and 1987. The long string of goals from Claus Nielsen, also helped Brøndby to win the Danish championship in 1985 and 1987. He continued to play well in spring 1988, but as he transferred to Panathinaikos already after the first half of the season, he was not in contention to repeat his win of the Brøndby topscorer title in 1988.

Panathinaikos
He played the 1988–89 season for the Greek club Panathinaikos. But with only 6 goals during 20 games, his time in Greece was only a limited success.

FC Twente
After his short Greek adventure, he played the next two seasons from 1989 to 1991 for FC Twente, in the Dutch Eredivisie. Here he continued to score a high rate of goals, by netting a total number of 22 goals in 39 games.

Return to Brøndby
In July 1991 he transferred back to Brøndby again. After playing 13 games in autumn 1991, a serious knee injury kept him away from the pitch throughout the entire spring 1992. He made a short comeback attempt in autumn 1992, but the injury continued to trouble him, so he only played four more games for the club in the autumn (with the last one in November 1992). Because his injury was more or less a permanent problem, he ended his football career in March 1993.

International career
Nielsen played 14 games and scored 8 goals for the Denmark national football team from October 1986 to June 1991. His knee injury put an early stop to his International career at 27 years of age.

Career highlights

Club statistics
Total number of goals for Brøndby (1984–1988 and 1991–1992):

References

External links
Danish national team profile 

Danish Superliga statistics

1964 births
Living people
People from Kalundborg
Association football forwards
Danish men's footballers
Danish expatriate men's footballers
Brøndby IF players
Denmark international footballers
Denmark under-21 international footballers
FC Twente players
Panathinaikos F.C. players
Eredivisie players
Super League Greece players
Expatriate footballers in Greece
Expatriate footballers in the Netherlands
Danish expatriate sportspeople in the Netherlands
Danish expatriate sportspeople in Greece
Sportspeople from Region Zealand